Colorama is the second album by American progressive rock band The Flyin' Ryan Brothers, released in 1999.

Track listing

Personnel
Jimmy Ryan – guitars, vocals, additional instrumentation, production, mixing
Johnny Ryan – guitars, vocals, additional instrumentation, production, mixing
Mike Batio – lead guitar on "I Wanna Be a Klingon", "Captain Nemo" and "The Prophecy", mixing
Tommy Dziallo – rhythm guitar on "Gotta get Up", lead guitar on "The Prophet"
Jim "Mudpuppy" Wiley – lead vocals on "Flip City"
Nick Cortese – backing vocals on "Said and Done", "Flip City" and "Innocent Mind", vocals on "Promise of Love"
Johnny Mrozek – backing vocals on "Said and Done", "Flip City" and "Innocent Mind"
Mark Richardson – mastering
John Foss – photography
Dorothy Kosier – typesetting
Jim Molick – layout
Mark Helmke – layout

References

The Flyin' Ryan Brothers albums
1999 albums